Fyrisån ("the Fyris river") is a river in the Swedish province of Uppland, which passes through the city of Uppsala and ends in Lake Mälaren.

The "Sala" river in Uppland was changed in the 17th century in memory of the Fyrisvellir battle, mentioned in the Icelandic sagas, as it was the belief that the marshy plains called "Föret" was the site of the famous Battle of Fýrisvellir in the late 10th century. 

Boats can sail up the river from Lake Mälaren all the way to central Uppsala where two weirs make further progress impossible. In the summer of 2007 the construction of a fish ladder was started, in order to make it possible for the asp, an endangered and potamodromous fish, to pass the weirs and reach its spawning waters. On the last day of April every year, during The Uppsala River Rafting Event, students attempt to navigate the weirs on homemade rafts with predictable results.

References

Uppland
Rivers of Uppsala County
Norrström basin